Accent on Youth is a Broadway play written by Samson Raphaelson which debuted on Christmas Day, 1934.  The plot concerns a lazy, middle-aged playwright who is spurred to write by his new young secretary.  The original cast included Nicholas Hannen as playwright Steven Gaye and Constance Cummings as secretary Linda Brown.

The play has been filmed several times.  The 1935 film Accent on Youth starred Herbert Marshall and Sylvia Sidney.  The second film version was a musical and titled Mr. Music in 1950, starring Bing Crosby and Nancy Olson.  The third film version, titled But Not for Me (1959), starred Clark Gable with Carroll Baker.

References

External links
 
1953 Best Plays radio adaptation of play at Internet Archive

1934 plays
Broadway plays
American plays adapted into films